Situated on the sapphire coastline of Amanzimtoti, Galleria Mall is a regional shopping centre that serves both Amanzimtoti and nearby towns. The mall hosts retail giants as well as exclusive boutiques, entertainment, fashion, dining and more.

Major chainstores 
 Pick n Pay Stores 
 Checkers 
 Game 
 Woolworths South Africa 
 Truworths 
 Jet Stores 
 Edgars 
 American Swiss 
 @home 
 Ackermans

References

Buildings and structures in KwaZulu-Natal
Economy of KwaZulu-Natal
Shopping centres in Durban
EThekwini Metropolitan Municipality